The Rider Broncs are the athletic teams of Rider University, a private nonsectarian university in Lawrenceville, New Jersey, United States. The school is a Division I member of the National Collegiate Athletic Association (NCAA), and its athletes compete in the Metro Atlantic Athletic Conference (MAAC). For wrestling only, Rider is an affiliate member of the Mid-American Conference (MAC).

The intercollegiate sports program at Rider was started by coach Clair Bee in the 1920s. Two of the school's most famous athletic alumni are former Notre Dame basketball coach and current ESPN sportscaster Digger Phelps, who played basketball at Rider from 1959 to 1963 and Jason Thompson who played basketball at Rider from 2004 to 2008 and was drafted by the Sacramento Kings with the 12th pick of the 2008 NBA Draft.

Men's sports

Baseball

See footnote
The baseball team has won three MAAC championships (2008, 2010, 2021), three NEC titles (1994, 1995, 1996), and six ECC titles (1984-1987, 1989, 1992) and participated in 15 NCAA Regional Tournaments and one College World Series (1967). The baseball team plays its home games at Sonny Pittaro Field on campus.

Men's basketball

Alumnus Jason Thompson started his NBA career in 2008.

Men's cross country

Men's golf
Austin Devereux won the individual title at the 2021 &2022 MAAC Championships, becoming the first Rider golfer to compete in the NCAA Championships since 1964.
The 2022 team won the school's  first  MAAC title on April 24, 2022 at Walt Disney World's Magnolia course.

Men's soccer

The Men's Soccer team has won one NEC Championship (1992) and five MAAC Championships (1997, 1998, 2015, 2016, 2018) and participated in five NCAA tournaments.

Men's swimming and diving

The men's swimming and diving team has won 10 MAAC Championships (2004, 2012-2020) and has won the last nine titles in a row.

Men's tennis

Men's track and field

Men’s track and field has won one MAAC Indoor Championship (2017) and three MAAC Outdoor Championships (2004, 2011, 2013) and is currently coached by Penn State All-American Bob Hamer (Penn State).

Men's wrestling
Rider wrestling practices in a 3,600 square foot mat room on the top floor of the Canastra Health & Sports Center while home meets are held in Alumni Gym, which seats 1,650. In 2013, Rider left the CAA as an associate member shortly after the CAA announced that it would no longer sponsor wrestling and joined the Eastern Wrestling League. On March 5, 2019 it was announced that Rider along with the other six members of the EWL would be joining the Mid-American Conference as affiliate members starting in academic year 2019-2020, making the MAC the second largest conference in Division I Wrestling. The Broncs won the MAC East Division in their first season in the MAC.

Rider Broncs Wrestling has gained national recognition by longtime head coach Gary Taylor, who retired after the 2016-17 season. Former Rider All-American John Hangey was named his replacement. The Broncs have had 18 individual All-American wrestlers, including four in Taylor's last three seasons. Jesse Dellavecchia finished runner-up at 157 in the 2021 NCAA Championships.

Women's sports

Women's basketball

Rider's women's basketball team has made the WNIT twice (2017, 2019) and finished as the #1 seed in the MAAC in 2019-2020. Stella Johnson became the first Lady Bronc to score 2,000 points on February 20, 2020 against Quinnipiac. She was drafted in the 3rd round of the 2020 WNBA draft by the Phoenix Mercury, with the 29th overall pick. She was waived by the Mercury before the start of the season, but was signed by the Chicago Sky on June 29, 2020.[4] On July 28, she made her WNBA debut in a win over the Los Angeles Sparks.[5] On August 12, she was waived by the Sky.[6] On August 13, the Washington Mystics signed Johnson after they were issued an emergency hardship waiver.

Women's cross country

Women's field hockey

The field hockey team now competes in the NEC  through 2021, where the Broncs have won seven titles (2000, 2002, 2004, 2010-2012, 2020*), played in six NCAA Play-In games and one NCAA Tournament (2020*). *2020 season was played in spring 2021 due to COVID-19 pandemic.

Women's soccer

The women's soccer team has won one MAAC title (2014) and participated in one NCAA Tournament (2014).

Women's softball

The softball team has won one NEC Championship (1997), one MAAC Championship (2003) and participated in two NCAA tournaments (1997, 2003).

Women's swimming and diving

The women's swimming and diving team has won three MAAC Championships (2001, 2003, 2009).

Women's tennis

Women's track and field
The women's track and field team has won two MAAC Indoor Championships (2007, 2020) and three MAAC Outdoor Championships (2004, 2007, 2013).

Women's volleyball
The women's volleyball team has won three NEC championships (1994–96), one MAAC Championship (2020*) and played in four NCAA Championships (1994–96, 2020*). They have won one match (1994 vs. Army). *2020 season was played in spring 2021 due to COVID-19 pandemic

Athletics Hall of Fame
For an alphabetical list of inductees, see footnote
As of June 13, 2011, there are 98 members in the Rider University Athletics Hall of Fame. The first inductions were in October 1990.

Notable alumni

See also
List of college athletic programs in New Jersey

Footnotes

External links
 

 
Sports teams in the New York metropolitan area